The Catharina was a barque, built 1810 in Kiel, and weighing 350 tons.

Voyages
Hamburg to Port Adelaide, South Australia - 21 September 1838 to 20 January 1839
On board were a group of Lutheran dissidents, 'Kavel's People', including Johann Friedrich Krummnow, which wanted to form a community in Australia. En route Krummnow taught the girls but was deemed "not completely satisfactory and the community did not allow him to teach in Australia".
Port Adelaide, South Australia to Batavia - departed 27 February 1839

References

Notes

 "Ships arriving in South Australia 1838", Pioneers Association of South Australia
 "Shipping Arrivals", South Australian Genealogy & Heraldry Society Inc
 "Catharina", Private homepage of Graeme Moad
"Captain Dirk Hahn and the "Hahndorf" passengers to South Australia", German Australia, David Nutting
 "Catharina 1839", Private webpages of DIANE CUMMINGS

Barques